Karin Evans (1907–2004) was a South African-born German stage and film actress. Evans was born in Johannesburg to one British and one German parent. In 1923 she moved to Berlin to study theatre, and began performing in the stage productions of Max Reinhardt. She made her film debut in the 1927 silent crime film The Trial of Donald Westhof (1927) and then appeared intermittently in a mixture of leading and supporting roles. In 1964 she appeared in the comedy Fanny Hill which proved to be her final screen appearance. She was married to the painter Wolf Hoffmann.

Selected filmography
 The Trial of Donald Westhof (1927)
 Boycott (1930)
 The Last Company (1930)
 The Concert (1931)
 The Gentleman Without a Residence (1934)
 My Life for Maria Isabella (1935)
 Pygmalion (1935)
 Ich klage an (1941)
 Blum Affair (1948)
 Street Acquaintances (1948)
 Such a Charade (1953)
 The Perfect Couple (1954)
 Love Without Illusions (1955)
 Without You All Is Darkness (1956)
 Sweetheart of the Gods (1960)
 Fanny Hill (1964)

References

Bibliography
 Frasier, David K. Russ Meyer-The Life and Films: A Biography and a Comprehensive, Illustrated and Annotated Filmography and Bibliography. McFarland, 1997.

External links

1907 births
2004 deaths
German stage actresses
German film actresses
German silent film actresses
People from Johannesburg
South African emigrants to Germany
20th-century German actresses
South African people of German descent